Karl-Heinz Lehner is an Austrian operatic and concert bass-baritone.

Life 
After the Abitur, he studied at the Universität für Musik und darstellende Kunst Wien, wo Leopold Spitzer in singing and Edith Mathis in Lied and oratorio were his teachers.

After completing his training, Lehner received his first permanent engagement at the Stadttheater Bremerhaven, which he left after two seasons to move to the Opernhaus Dortmund, where he had the opportunity to work on an extensive repertoire. He then moved to the Aalto-Theater in Essen.

He received guest contracts at the Komische Oper Berlin, the Volksoper Wien and the Opernhaus Graz, and he performed as King Marke at the Teatro dell'Opera di Roma and as Colline at the Bregenzer Festspiele. He made his debut as Sparafucile at the Hamburgische Staatsoper and as Orest at the Bayerische Staatsoper in Munich.

Since 2006, Lehner has performed in various roles at the Bayreuth Festival.

In addition to his opera activities, Lehner is also a concert singer. This activity has taken him to the Wiener Konzerthaus, the Konzerthaus Dortmund, the Wiener Musikverein, the Salzburg Festival and the Saalbau Essen.

Among the directors under whom he worked were Claus Guth, Jens-Daniel Herzog, Stefan Herheim and Anselm Weber.

Repertoire 
 Méphistophélès in Faust
 Sarastro in the Magic Flute
 Il Commendatore in Don Giovanni
 Colline in La Bohème
 Baron Ochs auf Lerchenau in Der Rosenkavalier
 Lodovico in Otello
 Sparafucile in Rigoletto
 Titurel in Parsifal
 Fafner in Das Rheingold and Siegfried
 A night guard in Die Meistersinger von Nürnberg
 Hermann, Landgraf von Thüringen in Tannhäuser
 König Marke in Tristan und Isolde

Awards 
 2000:

References

External links 
 

Austrian operatic baritones
Year of birth unknown
Living people
People from Eggenburg
Year of birth missing (living people)